Miroslav Petko (born 24 March 1995) is a Slovak football defender who currently plays for 1. FC Tatran Prešov.

Club career

1. FC Tatran Prešov
Petko made his debut for 1. FC Tatran Prešov against FK Bodva Moldava nad Bodvou on 3 October 2014.

References

External links
 1. FC Tatran Prešov official club profile
 Fortuna Liga profile
 
 Eurofotbal profile
 Futbalnet profile

1995 births
Living people
Slovak footballers
Association football defenders
1. FC Tatran Prešov players
FC Lokomotíva Košice players
Partizán Bardejov players
Slovak Super Liga players
2. Liga (Slovakia) players
Sportspeople from Prešov